Caulanthus simulans is a species of flowering plant in the family Brassicaceae known by the common names Payson's wild cabbage and Payson's jewelflower. It is endemic to southern California, where it is known mainly from open, dry habitat in the hills and deserts of Riverside and San Diego Counties. It is a bristly annual herb with deeply cut leaves, the longest arranged in cluster around the base of the stem. The flower is covered in thick, purple-tinted greenish sepals which split to reveal narrow, pale yellow petals at the tip. The fruit is a silique up to 8 centimeters long.

References

External links
Jepson Manual Treatment
USDA Plants Profile
Photo gallery

simulans
Flora of California
Plants described in 1923
Flora without expected TNC conservation status